This is a list of mayors of San Bernardino.

List

References

San Bernardino, California
M